Diceratura roseofasciana is a species of moth of the family Tortricidae. It is found in southern Europe (from Portugal to Romania, Ukraine and European Russia) and in Asia Minor, Iran (Khuzestan Province), Transcaucasia and Kazakhstan.

The wingspan is 9–13 mm. Adults are on wing from May to August.

References

Moths described in 1855
Cochylini